Kim Do-hoon (born 21 July 1970) is a South Korean professional football manager and former player. He was most recently the manager of Singaporean club Lion City Sailors before his 11 August 2022 resignation.

Playing career 
Kim during his playing career had played for Jeonbuk Hyundai Motors, Vissel Kobe, and Seongnam Ilhwa Chunma during his professional career. He also played for the South Korean national team and was a participant during the 1998 FIFA World Cup in France.

On 28 March 1999, Kim scored the only goal in a 1–0 exhibition win over Brazil. As a result of his goal, South Korea became the first and only Asian nation to defeat Brazil.

Managerial career 
Before becoming a manager, Kim started his coaching career as the assistant coach  Seongnam Ilhwa Chunma from 2005 to 2012. After that his coaching career as the assistant coach Gangwon in 2013 and the South Korean under-20 team in 2014. He managed Incheon United from 2015 to 2016 and then Ulsan Hyundai from 2016 to 2020 in South Korea's K League. While managing Ulsan, he led his team to win the 2020 AFC Champions League title.

On 18 May 2021, Kim was appointed to manage Singapore Premier League club Lion City Sailors on a two-and-a-half year contract.  During his maiden season, he led the Sailors to win the 2021 Singapore Premier League title.

On 24 July 2022, he headbutted Tampines Rovers assistant coach Mustafic Fahrudin near the end of a game. On 11 August 2022, Kim resigned after he received a three-match suspension for his forceful outburst.

Career statistics

Club

International

Results list South Korea's goal tally first.

Honours

Player
Yonsei University
Korean President's Cup: 1989

Sangmu FC
Korean Semi-professional League (Spring): 1994

Jeonbuk Hyundai Motors
Korean FA Cup: 2000
Asian Cup Winners' Cup runner-up: 2001–02

Seongnam Ilhwa Chunma
K League 1: 2003
Korean League Cup: 2004
AFC Champions League runner-up: 2004

South Korea B
Summer Universiade silver medal: 1993
East Asian Games: 1993

South Korea
EAFF Championship: 2003

Individual
Korean Semi-professional League (Spring) top goalscorer: 1994
K League 1 top goalscorer: 2000, 2003
K League 1 Best XI: 2000, 2003
Korean League Cup top goalscorer: 2001
K League 1 Most Valuable Player: 2003
AFC Champions League top goalscorer: 2004

Manager
Ulsan Hyundai
Korean FA Cup: 2017
AFC Champions League: 2020

Lion City Sailors
Singapore Premier League: 2021
Singapore Community Shield: 2022

Notes

References

External links
 
 
 
 
 

1970 births
Living people
Gimcheon Sangmu FC players
Jeonbuk Hyundai Motors players
Vissel Kobe players
Seongnam FC players
K League 1 Most Valuable Player Award winners
K League 1 players
J1 League players
Incheon United FC managers
Ulsan Hyundai FC managers
2002 CONCACAF Gold Cup players
2001 FIFA Confederations Cup players
Footballers at the 2000 Summer Olympics
Olympic footballers of South Korea
1998 FIFA World Cup players
1996 AFC Asian Cup players
Expatriate footballers in Japan
Expatriate footballers in Singapore
South Korean expatriate sportspeople in Japan
South Korean expatriate sportspeople in Singapore
South Korean expatriate footballers
South Korea international footballers
South Korean footballers
Association football forwards
Sportspeople from South Gyeongsang Province
Yonsei University alumni
South Korean Buddhists
South Korean football managers
Universiade medalists in football
Universiade silver medalists for South Korea
Footballers at the 1994 Asian Games
Asian Games competitors for South Korea